San Marino participated in the Eurovision Song Contest 2022 in Turin, Italy, with the song "Stripper" performed by Achille Lauro. The Sammarinese broadcaster, San Marino RTV (SMRTV), organised a new national final concept entitled  ("A voice for San Marino") to decide their representative. The event consisted of 299 emerging and nine established artists competing over a three month period from December 2021 through February 2022 for the opportunity to represent the nation at the contest. The winning entry "Stripper" was written by Lauro, Daniele Dezi, Daniele Mungai, Davide Petrella, Federico De Marinis, Francesco Viscovo, Gregorio Calculli, Marco Lanciotti, Mattia Cutolo and Simon Pietro Manzari.

A promotional tour was initially scheduled, but appearances were susbequently canceled due to the rise in COVID-19 cases occurring at the time. San Marino was drawn to compete in the second semi-final of the Eurovision Song Contest 2022 which took place on 12 May 2022. Performing during the show seventh in the running order, "Stripper" was not announced among the top 10 entries of its semi-final and therefore did not qualify to compete in the final. It was later revealed that San Marino placed 14th out of the 18 participating countries in the semi-final with 50 points.

Background 

The nation's debut entry in the 2008 contest, "" performed by Miodio, failed to qualify for the final and placed last in the semi-final it competed in. Following four consecutive non-qualifying years, San Marino qualified for the final for its second time in the Eurovision Song Contest 2019, where Serhat represented the nation for his second time and finished in 19th place in the final with "Say Na Na Na". Her song, "", which she performed alongside American rapper Flo Rida, qualified for the final, eventually placing 22nd out of the 26 entries. San Marino RTV (SMRTV) confirmed the nation's participation in the 2022 contest on 5 April 2021, at the same time also revealing that they intended to select their entry through a national final entitled Una voce per San Marino.

Before Eurovision

Una voce per San Marino
This marked the second time that the nation had opted to select their entry with a national final format, the first time being in 2018 with 1in360.

 was held between December 2021 and February 2022. Interested artists could apply to partake in the event through the official  website, which was open for submissions until 8 January 2022. There were no restrictions on the nationality of the performer nor the language of the song, though all artists and songs had to comply with the rules of the Eurovision Song Contest as set by the European Broadcasting Union (EBU). At the close of the application window, all selected artists were divided into two categories: Emerging and Established. Emerging artists attended an academy in the Teatro Titano in the City of San Marino from 13 to 17 December 2021 and 3–11 January 2022, acting as preliminary castings. Then, from 13 to 17 February 2022, a series of semi-finals decided the nine Emerging acts that moved on to the final. Established artists, numbering nine in total as well, were directly invited to the final by Media Evolution SRL. Aside from the first place act becoming the Sammarinese representative at Eurovision, the first, second and third placings of the final were also awarded €7000, €2000 and €1000, respectively.

Voting for the Emerging artists shows was performed by a seven member jury. The first four members of the jury for this category, announced on 16 November 2021, were Emilio Munda, Roberta Faccani,  and Steve Lyon. The remaining three jury members for the category were announced on 31 December 2021, and were Maurizio Raimo, Nabuk and Mimmo Paganelli.

Emerging acts auditions 
A submission period was opened by SMRTV on 22 September 2021 for emerging artists and composers to submit their entries. By 16 November 2021, the broadcaster announced it had received over 200 applications, particularly from Germany, Russia and Sweden, but also from other European countries, the United States and Australia. Near the close of the submission period, SMRTV reported that they had received 585 applications overall, out of which 299 were selected to take part in the emerging acts round. The emerging acts auditions took place between 13 and 17 December 2021 and 3–11 January 2022. From December and over the course of two months, the 299 participants took part in the auditions (though only 282 were listed). From the emerging acts round, 60 international entrants and six Sammarinese had qualified for the semi-finals and they were revealed on 17 January 2022. Highlights from the auditions were then broadcast on San Marino RTV over three consecutive Fridays from 14 January to 28 January 2022.

The six Sammarinese acts selected from the auditions were Alibi, Elisa Mazza, Garon × Duan, Giada Pintori, Ginevra Bencivenga and Giulia Vitri. The 60 international emerging acts and their country of origin were as follows:

Aaron Sibley (United Kingdom)
Alessandra Simone (Italy)
Alessia Labate (Italy)
Alice Burani (Italy)
Allerija (Italy)
Anna Faragò (Italy)
Ashley (Italy)
Brenda (Italy)
Camille Cabaltera (Italy)
Corinna Parodi (Italy)
Daniel Mincone (Italy)
Daniela Pisciotta (Italy)
Davide Rossi (Italy)
Diego Federico (Austria)
Elena & Francesco Faggi (Italy)
Elisa Del Prete (Italy)
Eliska Mrázová (Czech Republic)
Ellynora (Italy)
Florent Amare (France)
Frio (Italy)
Giada Varaschin (Italy)
Giorgio Borghes (Claudia F) (United Kingdom)
Gisele Abramoff (Brazil)
I Koko (Italy)
Jessica Anne Condon (United Kingdom)
João Paulo & Miguel (Portugal)
Joe Romano & TheStolenClipper (Italy)
Katrin Roselli (Italy)
Kimberly Genil (Italy)
Kumi Watanabe (Italy)
Kurt Cassar (Malta)
Le Bebae (Italy)
Leonardo Frezzotti (Italy)
Lorenza Rocchiccioli (Italy)
Luca Cima (Italy)
Luca Veneri (Italy)
Luci Blu (Italy)
Mad (Italy)
Marco Saltari (Italy)
Maria Chiara Leoni (Italy)
Martina Gaetano (Italy)
Mate (Italy)
Matilde Montanari (Italy)
Matteo Giannaccini Gravante (Italy)
Muriel (Italy)
Nada e Sissi (Italy)
OnlySara (Italy)
Operapop (Italy)
Oxa Sia (Germany)
Raimondo Cataldo (Italy)
Riccardo Foresi (Italy)
Riccardo Guglielmi (Italy)
Sebastian Schimdt (Germany)
Snei Ap (Italy)
Thomas Grazioso (Italy)
Tothem (Italy)
Valentina Tioli (Italy)
Vanja Vatle (Norway)
Veronica Liberati (Italy)
Vina Rose (Italy)

Semi-finals 
The 60 international emerging acts competed across three semi-finals from 13 February to 15 February 2022 and three acts qualified to the final from each respective semi-final. The next day, a fourth semi-final consisting of the six Sammarinese artists took place, with an additional three acts qualifying to the final. A second-chance round on 17 February 2022 allowed a further four of the previously eliminated emerging artists to qualify. A final for the emerging artists was held on 18 February 2022, where 9 of the 16 qualified acts proceeded to the final. All of these events took place at the Teatro Titano in the City of San Marino. 

Of the emerging acts participants, Muriel was announced to have been disqualified from the competition on 10 February 2022 for unspecified reasons. Additionally, Allerija, Corinna Parodi and Diego Federico had been announced as participants in the semi-final, but were absent from the show without explanation.

Key:
 Finalist
 Second Chance
 Absent

Sammarinese artists final 
The final for the competing entrants from San Marino took place on 16 February 2022. Six artists took part, with three advancing to the final.

Second chance 
The second chance round took place on 17 February 2022 and featured the fifteen acts that finished in 4th to 8th place in the first three semi-finals. Five of the fifteen acts qualified for the Emerging acts final.

Emerging acts final 
The Emerging acts final took place on 18 February 2022 and featured the 17 qualifying acts from the previous four shows. Nine of the 17 acts qualified for a place in the final.

Established artists 
On 8 February 2022, SMRTV announced the identity of the ten established artists that qualified automatically for the final in their category. One day before the final, it was announced that established participant Blind had withdrawn due to health reasons.

Final 
A total of 18 artists participated, nine from the Emerging section and nine from the Established section. A five-member jury decided the top three, with the winner going on to represent the country at Eurovision 2022. Each jury member assigned points to the entries ranging from one to ten based on their personal preferences, with the winner being the entry with the highest point total. The jury consisted of: Mogol (songwriter; jury president), Simon Lee (conductor, composer and arranger), Clarissa Martinelli (radio presenter), Susanne Georgi ( representative) and Dino Stewart (managing director at BMG Italy). Faccani, who had been a member of the emerging artists jury earlier in the process, opted to not continue in that role for the final. The winner of the event was Achille Lauro with the song "Stripper", marking the fourth time that an Italian artist had been selected to represent San Marino. "Stripper" was written by Lauro, Daniele Dezi, Daniele Mungai, Davide Petrella, Federico De Marinis. Francesco Viscovo, Gregorio Calculli, Marco Lanciotti, Matteo Ciceroni, Mattia Cutolo and Simon Pietro Manzari.

Promotion 
To promote "Stripper" as the entry for San Marino, the song was released on all digital platforms on 4 March 2022, coinciding with the release of a lyric video. A promotional music video of the performance during the final  had previously been released on the YouTube channel of the Eurovision Song Contest on 23 February. The song was due to be performed at the 26 March Eurovision Party in Barcelona, but was unable to after members of the band contracted COVID-19. Lauro indicated that due to the inability to use playbacks, he would be unable to perform without the band. The next day, SMRTV announced that they had opted to not have the singer perform at the Eurovision in Concert event on 9 April in Amsterdam either or at any other live pre-Eurovision events, citing the rise in COVID-19 cases occurring at the time.

A free "Meet & Greet" for fans was scheduled for 23 April at Teatro Concordia in Borgo Maggiore, San Marino, however, the event was postponed shortly after its announcement, with staff citing the entrant's rehearsal schedule and security as being factors. A previously announced press conference on 22 April, the day before, did take place at the Palazzo Pubblico, where Lauro spoke about the link Eurovision creates between countries.

At Eurovision 
Prior to the semi-final allocation draw, the European Broadcasting Union (EBU) split the competing countries into six different pots based on voting patterns from previous contests as determined by the contest's televoting partner Digame, with the aim of reducing the chance of neighbourly voting between countries while also increasing suspense during the voting process. Therein, it was announced that San Marino was scheduled to perform in the first half of the second semi-final of the contest, to be held on 12 May. Once all the competing entries for the 2022 contest had been released, the running order for the semi-finals was decided by the producers of the contest to prevent similar songs from being placed next to each other. In San Marino, the two semi-finals and the final were broadcast on San Marino RTV and Radio San Marino with commentary by Lia Fiorio and Gigi Restivo.

Performances

Achille took part in rehearsals on 2 and 5 May, followed by dress rehearsals on 11 and 12 May 2022. This included the jury show where the five-member juries of eighteen of the participating countries, responsible for 50 percent of each country's respective vote, watched and voted on the competing entries of the second semi-final. The performance of "Stripper" saw Lauro dressed in a sheer bodysuit wearing a fur boa and cowboy hat. Two members of his band were in cages, while the guitarist interacted with Lauro throughout the performance, including kissing the singer. At one point, Lauro rides a velvet pink mechanical bull in the performance, which also featured fireworks. Many media outlets noted the positive response to the same sex kiss as a historic moment in Eurovision. At the end of the voting phase for the second semi-final, San Marino was not announced as a qualifier for the final. It was later revealed that the nation placed 14th out of the 18 competing nations in the second semi-final with a total of 50 points.

Voting
Voting during the three shows involved each country awarding two sets of points from 1–8, 10 and 12: one from their expert jury and the other from televoting. Each nation's jury consisted of five music industry professionals who are citizens of the country they represent. The jury judged each entry based on vocal capacity, the stage performance, the song's composition and originality and the overall impression by the act. No member of a national jury was permitted to be connected in any way to any of the competing acts in such a way that they cannot vote impartially and independently. Labiuse served as the Sammarinese spokesperson, announcing the votes awarded by the Sammarinese jury during the final. Below is a breakdown of points awarded to San Marino and awarded by San Marino in both the first semi-final and the final of the contest, and the breakdown of the jury voting and televoting conducted during the two shows.

Points awarded to San Marino

Points awarded by San Marino

Jury vote issues
In a statement released during the broadcast of the final, the EBU revealed that six countries, including San Marino, were found to have irregular jury voting patterns during the second semi-final. Consequently, these countries were given substitute aggregated jury scores for both the second semi-final and the final (shown above), calculated from the corresponding jury scores of countries with historically similar voting patterns as determined by the pots for the semi-final allocation draw held in January. As such, San Marino's jury votes were determined based on those from Bulgaria, Cyprus, Greece, Malta and Portugal. Their televoting scores were unaffected. The Flemish broadcaster VRT later reported that the juries involved had made agreements to vote for each others' entries to secure qualification to the final. 

On 19 May, the EBU released a further statement clarifying the irregularities in voting patterns. This confirmed that the six countries involved had consistently scored each others' entries disproportionately highly in the second semi-final: the Sammarinese jury, as well as the juries from Azerbaijan, Georgia and Romania, had each ranked the other five countries' entries as their top five, proving beyond statistical coincidence that they had colluded to achieve a higher placing. This prompted the suspension of San Marino's intended jury scores (shown below) in favour of the EBU's calculated aggregate scores, presented above.

Detailed final results 
The EBU published these detailed results for a short time on 13 July 2022.

References

External links
 

2022
Countries in the Eurovision Song Contest 2022
Eurovision